Tactical Group "Belarus" is a group of volunteers from Belarus who were involved in the Donbas War. They fought on the side of Ukraine, first as part of the Right Sector Ukrainian Volunteer Corps, and later as part of various formations of the Ukrainian volunteer battalions and the Armed Forces of Ukraine.

History

Prerequisites 
Belarusian volunteers had been involved in the War in the Donbas since the beginning of hostilities in the spring of 2014. In the same year, a group of Belarusian volunteers created a detachment called the "Pogonya" detachment. Belarusian volunteers took part in the Battle of Avdiivka in 2014.

Creation and battle path 
The Belarus Tactical Group was established on August 8, 2015, after negotiations with Belarusian activists and the leadership of the Ukrainian Volunteer Corps Right Sector. Its fighters fought in the battles at Butivka mine, Pisky, Volnovakha, and Marinka.

In mid-August 2015, near Volnovakha, the group fought a battle in which two volunteers, Vitaliy Tilizhenko and Ales Cherkashin, were killed.

On March 9, 2022, during the 2022 Russian invasion of Ukraine, the Tactical group "Belarus" announced in its social networks that the Kastus Kalinouski Battalion had been formed, which was later transformed into a regiment.

Personnel 
It is not known how many soldiers served in the formation. It is known that the group includes ex-political prisoner Eduard Lobau, Belarusian opposition activist Yan Melnikov, as well as fighters with the nicknames "Warrior", "Bison" and "Tour".

Persecution in Belarus 
The law enforcement agencies of Belarus have repeatedly stated that citizens whose participation in the war in eastern Ukraine is proven will be punished under the "Mercenary" criminal article, the sanction of which can reach from 3 to 7 years in prison.

In May 2016, Alina Fortuna, a fighter of the Belarus tactical group, was deported from Belarus.

The page of the tactical group "Belarus" on Facebook and "VKontakte" is banned in Belarus.

Losses and commemoration 
On March 28, 2016, a Monument to the Belarusians who died for Ukraine was unveiled in Kyiv. It lists the names of Mykhailo Zhyznevsky, who died during the Euromaidan events, as well as Ales Cherkashin and Vitaly Tilizhenko, two volunteers of the Belarus tactical group who were killed in action.

In February 2017, the exhibition "Ukrainian East" opened at the National Museum of the History of Ukraine in the Second World War. The exposition also includes items used by fighters of the tactical group "Belarus" as well as a white-red-white flag, a bulletproof vest of Alexander Cherkashin and a helmet of Vitaly Tilizhenko.

Honors 
On September 4, 2015, a number of fighters of the tactical group "Belarus", in particular fighters with the nicknames "Doc", "Belarus" and "Lion" were awarded the Ukrainian Orthodox Church of the Kyiv Patriarchate Medal "For Sacrifice and Love for Ukraine". Cherkashin and Tilizhenko received these awards posthumously.

Ales Cherkashin was awarded the Order of the People's Hero of Ukraine.

In October 2016, a fighter with the nickname "Zubr" received the award "For the sacrifice of the Ukrainian people."

See also 

 Kastuś Kalinoŭski Battalion

References

External links
Tactical group "Belarus" on Facebook (bel.)
Tactical group "Belarus" in the network vk.com (bel.)
Tactical group "Belarus" on YouTube (bel.)

2015 in Ukraine
Belarus in the 2022 Russian invasion of Ukraine
Belarus–Ukraine relations
Military units and formations of Ukraine in the war in Donbas
Armies in exile
Foreign volunteer units resisting the 2022 Russian invasion of Ukraine